The Letting Go is a 2006 studio album by Bonnie "Prince" Billy. It was released on Drag City.

Production
The album was recorded in Reykjavík, Iceland and produced by Valgeir Sigurðsson, who is known for his work with the Icelandic artist Björk. The arrangement was done by Nico Muhly. Dawn McCarthy of Faun Fables also sings on the album.

The album's title comes from the last lines of the Emily Dickinson poem that starts "After a Great Pain, A Formal Feeling Comes."

This is the hour of lead
Remembered if outlived,
As freezing persons recollect the snow,
First chill, then stupor, then the letting go.

Critical reception

At Metacritic, which assigns a weighted average score out of 100 to reviews from mainstream critics, The Letting Go received an average score of 84% based on 24 reviews, indicating "universal acclaim".

Pitchfork placed The Letting Go at number 195 on their list of top 200 albums of the 2000s.

Track listing

Personnel
Credits adapted from liner notes.

 Emmett Kelly – guitar
 Dawn McCarthy – singing
 Paul Oldham – bass
 Valgeir Sigurðsson – recording, mixing
 Jim White – drums

Charts

References

External links
 

2006 albums
Will Oldham albums
Drag City (record label) albums
Domino Recording Company albums